Protocol Buffers (Protobuf) is a free and open-source cross-platform data format used to serialize structured data. It is useful in developing programs to communicate with each other over a network or for storing data.  The method involves an interface description language that describes the structure of some data and a program that generates source code from that description for generating or parsing a stream of bytes that represents the structured data.

Overview
Google developed Protocol Buffers for internal use and provided a code generator for multiple languages under an open-source license (see below).

The design goals for Protocol Buffers emphasized simplicity and performance. In particular, it was designed to be smaller and faster than XML.

Protocol Buffers are widely used at Google for storing and interchanging all kinds of structured information. The method serves as a basis for a custom remote procedure call (RPC) system that is used for nearly all inter-machine communication at Google.

Protocol Buffers are similar to the Apache Thrift (used by Facebook, Evernote), Ion (created by Amazon), or Microsoft Bond protocols, offering as well a concrete RPC protocol stack to use for defined services called gRPC.

Data structures (called messages) and services are described in a proto definition file (.proto) and compiled with protoc.  This compilation generates code that can be invoked by a sender or recipient of these data structures.  For example, example.pb.cc and example.pb.h are generated from example.proto.  They define C++ classes for each message and service in example.proto.

Canonically, messages are serialized into a binary wire format which is compact, forward- and backward-compatible, but not self-describing (that is, there is no way to tell the names, meaning, or full datatypes of fields without an external specification). There is no defined way to include or refer to such an external specification (schema) within a Protocol Buffers file. The officially supported implementation includes an ASCII serialization format, but this format—though self-describing—loses the forward- and backward-compatibility behavior, and according to some, is thus not a good choice for applications other than debugging.

Though the primary purpose of Protocol Buffers is to facilitate network communication, its simplicity and speed make Protocol Buffers an alternative to data-centric C++ classes and structs, especially where interoperability with other languages or systems might be needed in the future.

Example
A schema for a particular use of protocol buffers associates data types with field names, using integers to identify each field. (The protocol buffer data contains only the numbers, not the field names, providing some bandwidth/storage savings compared with systems that include the field names in the data.)
// polyline.proto
syntax = "proto2";

message Point {
  required int32 x = 1;
  required int32 y = 2;
  optional string label = 3;
}

message Line {
  required Point start = 1;
  required Point end = 2;
  optional string label = 3;
}

message Polyline {
  repeated Point point = 1;
  optional string label = 2;
}

The "Point" message defines two mandatory data items, x and y. The data item label is optional. Each data item has a tag. The tag is defined after the equal sign. For example, x has the tag 1.

The "Line" and "Polyline" messages, which both use Point, demonstrate how composition works in Protocol Buffers. Polyline has a repeated field, which behaves like a vector.

This schema can subsequently be compiled for use by one or more programming languages. Google provides a compiler called protoc which can produce output for C++, Java or Python. Other schema compilers are available from other sources to create language-dependent output for over 20 other languages.

For example, after a C++ version of the protocol buffer schema above is produced, a C++ source code file, polyline.cpp, can use the message objects as follows:
// polyline.cpp
#include "polyline.pb.h"  // generated by calling "protoc polyline.proto"

Line* createNewLine(const std::string& name) {
  // create a line from (10, 20) to (30, 40)
  Line* line = new Line;
  line->mutable_start()->set_x(10);
  line->mutable_start()->set_y(20);
  line->mutable_end()->set_x(30);
  line->mutable_end()->set_y(40);
  line->set_label(name);
  return line;
}

Polyline* createNewPolyline() {
  // create a polyline with points at (10,10) and (20,20)
  Polyline* polyline = new Polyline;
  Point* point1 = polyline->add_point();
  point1->set_x(10);
  point1->set_y(10);
  Point* point2 = polyline->add_point();
  point2->set_x(20);
  point2->set_y(20);
  return polyline;
}

Language support
Protobuf 2.0 provides a code generator for C++, Java, C#, and Python.

Protobuf 3.0 provides a code generator for C++, Java (including JavaNano, a dialect intended for low-resource environments), Python, Go, Ruby, Objective-C, C#. It also supports JavaScript since 3.0.0-beta-2.

Third-party implementations are also available for Ballerina, C, C++, Dart, Elixir, Erlang, Haskell, JavaScript, Perl, PHP, Prolog, R, Rust, Scala, Swift, Julia and Nim.

See also

 gRPC
 Comparison of data-serialization formats
 FlatBuffers
 ASN.1

References

External links
 Official documentation at developers.google.com
 

Data serialization formats
Google software
Software using the BSD license